Deeside Gaelic was a dialect of Scottish Gaelic spoken in Aberdeenshire until 1984.Unlike a lot of extinct dialects of Scottish Gaelic, it is relatively well attested. A lot of the work pertaining to Deeside Gaelic was done by Frances Carney Diack,and was expanded upon by David Clement, Adam Watson and Seumas Grannd.

Decline
In Aberdeenshire, 18% of Crathie and Braemar and as much as 61% in Inverey were bilingual in 1891. By 1981, the dialect had died out.

Features in Deeside Gaelic
In the mid-20th Century the Scottish Gaelic Dialect Survey was undertaken when there were still people who spoke Deeside Gaelic. Features of Deeside Gaelic include:

 dropping of unstressed syllables; an example of this is the Word "Duine" becoming "duin'"
 weakening of the /o/ to a /u/ sound, words such as "Dol" being pronounced closer to "Dul"
 slender nn being pronounced like an English ng 
 mutation of f instead of being dropped is pronounced as a /v/ or /b/ or /p/ in Speyside
 dropping of -adh, words such as tuilleadh being recorded as tull
 conditional final stop; conditional tense was realised as a /g/ or /k/ sound in Braemar
 shortening of words; words such as agaibh being pronounced closer to "aki" and cinnteach being shortened to cinnt

References

Languages of the United Kingdom
Extinct languages of Europe
Scottish Gaelic dialects
Moray
Extinct Celtic languages
Extinct languages of Scotland
Aberdeenshire
Languages extinct in the 20th century